Erigeron austiniae is a species of flowering plant in the family Asteraceae known by the common name sagebrush fleabane. It is sometimes considered a variety of Erigeron chrysopsidis. It is native to the western United States from northeastern California to southwestern Idaho, where it grows in the sagebrush and juniper woodlands. It is a small, clumping perennial herb producing a hairy stem up to about 12 centimeters tall from a woody caudex and taproot surrounded by narrow linear to somewhat oval leaves up to 8 centimeters long. The inflorescence is a solitary flat-topped woolly flower head containing many yellow disc florets. There occasionally appears a yellow ray floret, but they are usually absent. The fruit is an achene with a pappus of bristles.

References

External links

austiniae
Flora of the Western United States
Flora without expected TNC conservation status